Lysophosphatidic acid receptor 3 also known as LPA3 is a protein that in humans is encoded by the LPAR3 gene. LPA3 is a G protein-coupled receptor that binds the lipid signaling molecule lysophosphatidic acid (LPA).

Function 

This gene encodes a member of the G protein-coupled receptor family, as well as the EDG family of proteins. This protein functions as a cellular receptor for lysophosphatidic acid and mediates lysophosphatidic acid-evoked calcium mobilization. This receptor couples predominantly to G(q/11) alpha proteins.

See also
 Lysophospholipid receptor

References

Further reading

External links

G protein-coupled receptors